Jef Desmedt (born 29 March 1972) is a Belgian former equestrian. He competed in the individual eventing at the 1992 Summer Olympics.

References

External links
 

1972 births
Living people
Belgian male equestrians
Olympic equestrians of Belgium
Equestrians at the 1992 Summer Olympics
People from Brecht, Belgium
Sportspeople from Antwerp Province
20th-century Belgian people